Mike Hoeffel (born April 9, 1989) is an American-German professional ice hockey winger who is currently an unrestricted free agent. He most recently played for Krefeld Pinguine then of the Deutsche Eishockey Liga (DEL).

Playing career
Hoeffel played collegiately for the Minnesota Golden Gophers men's ice hockey which competes in the WCHA after playing high school hockey for the Hill-Murray Pioneers of Minnesota. He was selected by the New Jersey Devils in the 2nd round (57th overall) of the 2007 NHL Entry Draft, and made his professional debut with New Jersey AHL affiliate, the Albany Devils.

On July 25, 2014, Hoeffel was signed as a free agent to a one-year AHL contract with the Springfield Falcons. In the 2014–15 season, Hoeffel contributed to the Falcons in a checking line role and recorded a professional high 9 goals in 62 games.

In the following 2015–16 season, Hoeffel was un-signed before belatedly returning to the Falcons, who had changed NHL affiliations, on a professional try-out contract on November 27, 2015. Having featured in only 4 scoreless games with the Falcons, Hoeffel sought a release from his try-out with Springfield and signed his first contract abroad in agreeing to a contract for the remainder of the year with Norwegian club, Stavanger Oilers of the GET-ligaen on December 14, 2015.

In possessing a German passport through his heritage, Hoeffel first played in Germany with Eispiraten Crimmitschau of the DEL2, before joining and playing the next three seasons in the DEL with the Fischtown Pinguins.

At the conclusion of the 2018–19 season, Hoeffel left Fischtown to sign a one-year contract with fellow DEL outfit, the Iserlohn Roosters, on March 29, 2019.

Awards and honors

References

External links

1989 births
Living people
Albany Devils players
American men's ice hockey forwards
ETC Crimmitschau players
Fischtown Pinguins players
Iserlohn Roosters players
Krefeld Pinguine players
Minnesota Golden Gophers men's ice hockey players
New Jersey Devils draft picks
Springfield Falcons players
Stavanger Oilers players
Ice hockey players from Minnesota
USA Hockey National Team Development Program players